The women's K-4 500 metres sprint canoeing competition at the 2010 Asian Games in Guangzhou was held on 25 November at the International Rowing Centre.

Schedule
All times are China Standard Time (UTC+08:00)

Results

References 

Official Website

External links 
Asian Canoe Confederation

Canoeing at the 2010 Asian Games